Weinblatt is a surname. Notable people with the surname include:

Lee Weinblatt, American inventor
Stuart Weinblatt, American rabbi